The tau proteins (abbreviated from tubulin associated unit) are a group of six highly soluble protein isoforms produced by alternative splicing from the gene MAPT (microtubule-associated protein tau). They have roles primarily in maintaining the stability of microtubules in axons and are abundant in the neurons of the central nervous system (CNS), where the cerebral cortex has the highest abundance. They are less common elsewhere but are also expressed at very low levels in CNS astrocytes and oligodendrocytes.

Pathologies and dementias of the nervous system such as Alzheimer's disease and Parkinson's disease are associated with tau proteins that have become hyperphosphorylated insoluble aggregates called neurofibrillary tangles. The tau proteins were identified in 1975 as heat-stable proteins essential for microtubule assembly, and since then they have been characterized as intrinsically disordered proteins.

Function

Microtubule stabilization 
Tau proteins are found more often in neurons than in non-neuronal cells in humans. One of tau's main functions is to modulate the stability of axonal microtubules. Other nervous system microtubule-associated proteins (MAPs) may perform similar functions, as suggested by tau knockout mice that did not show abnormalities in brain development – possibly because of compensation in tau deficiency by other MAPs.

Although tau is present in dendrites at low levels, where it is involved in postsynaptic scaffolding, it is active primarily in the distal portions of axons, where it provides microtubule stabilization but also flexibility as needed. Tau proteins interact with tubulin to stabilize microtubules and promote tubulin assembly into microtubules. Tau has two ways of controlling microtubule stability: isoforms and phosphorylation.

In addition to its microtubule-stabilizing function, Tau has also been found to recruit signaling proteins and to regulate microtubule-mediated axonal transport.

mRNA translation 
Tau is a negative regulator of mRNA translation in both Drosophila, mouse, and human brains, through its binding to ribosomes, which results in impaired ribosomal function, reduction of protein synthesis and altered synaptic function. Tau interacts specifically with several ribosomal proteins, including the crucial regulator of translation rpS6.

Behavior 
The primary non-cellular functions of tau is to negatively regulate long-term memory and to facilitate habituation (a form of non-associative learning), two higher and more integrated physiological functions. Since regulation of tau is critical for memory, this could explain the linkage between tauopathies and cognitive impairment.

In mice, while the reported tau knockout strains present without overt phenotype when young, when aged, they show some muscle weakness, hyperactivity, and impaired fear conditioning. However, neither spatial learning in mice, nor short-term memory (learning) in Drosophila seems to be affected by the absence of tau.

In addition, tau knockout mice have abnormal sleep-wake cycle, with increased wakefulness periods and decreased non-rapid eye movements (NREM) sleep time.

Other functions 
Other typical functions of tau include cellular signalling, neuronal development, neuroprotection and apoptosis. Atypical, non-standard roles of tau are also under current investigation, such as its involvement in chromosome stability, its interaction with the cellular transcriptome, its interaction with other cytoskeletal or synaptic proteins, its involvement in myelination or in brain insulin signaling, its role in the exposure to chronic stress and in depression, etc.

Genetics 

In humans, the MAPT gene for encoding tau protein is located on chromosome 17q21, containing 16 exons. The major tau protein in the human brain is encoded by 11 exons. Exons 2, 3 and 10 are alternatively spliced, which leads to the formation of six tau isoforms. In the human brain, tau proteins constitute a family of six isoforms with a range of 352–441 amino acids. Tau isoforms are different in having either zero, one, or two inserts of 29 amino acids at the N-terminal part (exons 2 and 3) and three or four repeat-regions at the C-terminal part (exon 10). Thus, the longest isoform in the CNS has four repeats (R1, R2, R3 and R4) and two inserts (441 amino acids total), while the shortest isoform has three repeats (R1, R3 and R4) and no insert (352 amino acids total).

The MAPT gene has two haplogroups, H1 and H2, in which the gene appears in inverted orientations. Haplogroup H2 is common only in Europe and in people with European ancestry. Haplogroup H1 appears to be associated with increased probability of certain dementias, such as Alzheimer's disease. The presence of both haplogroups in Europe means that recombination between inverted haplotypes can result in the lack of one of the functioning copies of the gene, resulting in congenital defects.

Structure 

Six tau isoforms exist in human brain tissue, and they are distinguished by their number of binding domains. Three isoforms have three binding domains and the other three have four binding domains. The binding domains are located in the carboxy-terminus of the protein and are positively charged (allowing it to bind to the negatively charged microtubule). The isoforms with four binding domains are better at stabilizing microtubules than those with three binding domains. Tau is a phosphoprotein with 79 potential Serine (Ser) and Threonine (Thr) phosphorylation sites on the longest tau isoform. Phosphorylation has been reported on approximately 30 of these sites in normal tau proteins.

Phosphorylation of tau is regulated by a host of kinases, including PKN, a serine/threonine kinase. When PKN is activated, it phosphorylates tau, resulting in disruption of microtubule organization. Phosphorylation of tau is also developmentally regulated. For example, fetal tau is more highly phosphorylated in the embryonic CNS than adult tau. The degree of phosphorylation in all six isoforms decreases with age due to the activation of phosphatases. Like kinases, phosphatases too play a role in regulating the phosphorylation of tau. For example, PP2A and PP2B are both present in human brain tissue and have the ability to dephosphorylate Ser396. The binding of these phosphatases to tau affects tau's association with microtubules.

Phosphorylation of tau has also been suggested to be regulated by O-GlcNAc modification at various Ser and Thr residues.

Mechanism 
The accumulation of hyperphosphorylated tau in neurons is associated with neurofibrillary degeneration. The actual mechanism of how tau propagates from one cell to another is not well identified. Also, other mechanisms, including tau release and toxicity, are unclear. As tau aggregates, it replaces tubulin, which in turn enhances fibrilization of tau. Several propagation methods have been proposed that occur by synaptic contact such as synaptic cell adhesion proteins, neuronal activity and other synaptic and non-synaptic mechanisms. The mechanism of tau aggregation is still not completely elucidated, but several factors favor this process, including tau phosphorylation and zinc ions.

Release 
Tau involves in uptake and release process, which is known as seeding. Uptake of tau protein mechanism requires the presence of heparan sulfate proteoglycans at the cell surface, which happen by macropinocytosis. On the other hand, tau release depends on neuronal activity. Many factors influence tau release, for example, type of isoforms or MAPT mutations that change the extracellular level of tau. According to Asai and his colleagues, the spreading of tau protein occurs from the entorhinal cortex to the hippocampal region in the early stages of the disease. They also suggested that microglia were also involved in the transport process, and their actual role is still unknown.

Toxicity 
Tau causes toxic effects through its accumulation inside cells. Many enzymes are involved in toxicity mechanism such as PAR-1 kinase. This enzyme stimulates phosphorylation of serine 262 and 356, which in turn leads to activate other kinases (GSK-3 and CDK5) that cause disease-associated phosphoepitopes. The degree of toxicity is affected by different factors, such as the degree of microtubule binding. Toxicity could also happen by neurofibrillary tangles (NFTs), which leads to cell death and cognitive decline.

Clinical significance 

Hyperphosphorylation of the tau protein (tau inclusions, pTau) can result in the self-assembly of tangles of paired helical filaments and straight filaments, which are involved in the pathogenesis of Alzheimer's disease, frontotemporal dementia and other tauopathies. All of the six tau isoforms are present in an often hyperphosphorylated state in paired helical filaments in the Alzheimer's disease brain. In other neurodegenerative diseases, the deposition of aggregates enriched in certain tau isoforms has been reported. When misfolded, this otherwise very soluble protein can form extremely insoluble aggregates that contribute to a number of neurodegenerative diseases. Tau protein has a direct effect on the breakdown of a living cell caused by tangles that form and block nerve synapses.

Gender-specific tau gene expression across different regions of the human brain has recently been implicated in gender differences in the manifestations and risk for tauopathies. Some aspects of how the disease functions also suggest that it has some similarities to prion proteins.

Tau hypothesis of Alzheimer's disease 

The tau hypothesis states that excessive or abnormal phosphorylation of tau results in the transformation of normal adult tau into paired-helical-filament (PHF) tau and neurofibrillary tangles (NFTs). The stage of the disease determines NFTs' phosphorylation. In AD, at least 19 amino acids are phosphorylated; pre-NFT phosphorylation occurs at serine 119, 202 and 409, while intra-NFT phosphorylation happens at serine 396 and threonine 231. Through its isoforms and phosphorylation, tau protein interacts with tubulin to stabilize microtubule assembly. All of the six tau isoforms are present in an often hyperphosphorylated state in paired helical filaments (PHFs) in the AD brain.

Tau mutations have many consequences, including microtubule dysfunction and alteration of the expression level of tau isoforms. Mutations that alter function and isoform expression of tau lead to hyperphosphorylation. The process of tau aggregation in the absence of mutations is not known but might result from increased phosphorylation, protease action or exposure to polyanions, such as glycosaminoglycans. Hyperphosphorylated tau disassembles microtubules and sequesters normal tau, MAPT 1 (microtubule associated protein tau 1), MAPT 2 and ubiquitin into tangles of PHFs. This insoluble structure damages cytoplasmic functions and interferes with axonal transport, which can lead to cell death.

Hyperphosphorylated forms of tau protein are the main component of PHFs of NFTs in the brain of AD patients. It has been well demonstrated that regions of tau six-residue segments, namely PHF6 (VQIVYK) and PHF6* (VQIINK), can form tau PHF aggregation in AD. Apart from the PHF6, some other residue sites like Ser285, Ser289, Ser293, Ser305 and Tyr310, located near the C-terminal of the PHF6 sequences, play key roles in the phosphorylation of tau. Hyperphosphorylated tau differs in its sensitivity and its kinase as well as alkaline phosphatase activity and is, along with beta-amyloid, a component of the pathologic lesion seen in Alzheimer disease. A recent hypothesis identifies the decrease of reelin signaling as the primary change in Alzheimer's disease that leads to the hyperphosphorylation of tau via a decrease in GSK3β inhibition.

A68 is a name sometimes given (mostly in older publications) to the hyperphosphorylated form of tau protein found in the brains of individuals with Alzheimer's disease.

In 2020, researchers from two groups published studies indicating that an immunoassay blood test for the p-tau-217 form of the protein could diagnose Alzheimer's up to decades before dementia symptoms were evident.

Traumatic brain injury 

Repetitive mild traumatic brain injury (TBI) is a central component of contact sports, especially American football, and the concussive force of military blasts. It can lead to chronic traumatic encephalopathy (CTE), a condition characterized by fibrillar tangles of hyperphosphorylated tau. After severe traumatic brain injury, high levels of tau protein in extracellular fluid in the brain are linked to poor outcomes.

Prion-like propagation hypothesis 
The term "prion-like" is often used to describe several aspects of tau pathology in various tauopathies, like Alzheimer's disease and frontotemporal dementia. True prions are defined by their ability to induce misfolding of native proteins to perpetuate the pathology. True prions, like PRNP, are also infectious with the capability to cross species. Since tau has yet to be proven to be infectious it is not considered to be a true prion but instead a "prion-like" protein. Much like true prions, pathological tau aggregates have been shown to have the capacity to induce misfolding of native tau protein. Both misfolding competent and non-misfolding competent species of tau aggregates have been reported, indicating a highly specific mechanism.

Interactions 

Tau protein has been shown to interact with:
 Alpha-synuclein,
 FYN,
Proto-oncogene tyrosine-protein kinase Src
 S100B, and
 YWHAZ.

See also 

 Tauopathy, a class of diseases associated with accumulated tau proteins
 Dementia pugilistica
 Alzheimer's disease
 Primary age-related tauopathy
 Aging-related tau astrogliopathy
 Corticobasal degeneration
 Progressive supranuclear palsy
 Proteopathy
 Pick's disease
 Frontotemporal dementia and parkinsonism linked to chromosome 17
 Prion

References

Further reading

External links

GeneReviews/NCBI/NIH/UW entry on MAPT-Related Disorders
MR scans of variant CJD CSF tau-positive man

Proteins